Hjo Municipality (Hjo kommun) is a municipality in Västra Götaland County in western Sweden. Its seat is located in the city of Hjo.

The municipality was created in 1971, when the City of Hjo was amalgamated with a part of the rural municipality Värsås. In 1974 parts of Fröjered and Fågelås were added.

Geography
Geographically it is situated by the western shore of Lake Vättern. The large and fish-rich waters have been the main influence on the industry. The largest rivulet intersecting the municipality from Vättern is the Hjo River. Parts of it have been made a nature reserve. Partly this is due to the salmon (Salmo trutta) and the grayling (Thymallus thymallus) that occur natural in the rivulet, but have had hard times due to dams.

References

External links

Hjo Municipality - Official site
Three Wooden Towns - Requires some plugin

Municipalities of Västra Götaland County
Skaraborg